Midden-Zeeland Airport , also known as Zeeland Airport, is an airport located  east northeast of Middelburg, Zeeland, in the Netherlands, just south of the Veerse Meer lagoon. It was founded in 1968 and officially opened in 1970.

References

External links 
 
 
 Airliners.net - Photos taken at Midden-Zeeland Airport

Airports in Zeeland
Buildings and structures in Middelburg, Zeeland
Transport in Middelburg, Zeeland